Turn Out the Lights may refer to:

 Turn Out the Lights (TV series), a British television sitcom
 Turn out the lights, the party's over-- lines of a song sung often by Don Meredith, a color commentator covering National Football League
 Turn Out the Lights (album), an album by American singer-songwriter Julien Baker.